Joana Pastrana Gallardo (born 29 September 1990) is a Spanish professional boxer who held the IBF female mini-flyweight title from 2018 to 2019. At regional level, she held the European female mini-flyweight title in 2017.

Career

Early career
Pastrana started boxing in 2013 in amateur competitions in her hometown Lozoyuela, Madrid. Before boxing, Pastrana practiced Muay Thai and kickboxing, but she did not like them, so she switched to boxing.

Professional career
Pastrana debuted professionally on 6 February 2016 defeating Bulgarian fighter Ivana Yaneva by technical knockout at the first round in a bout held at the Restaurante Escuela Taurina in Fuente el Saz de Jarama in the Community of Madrid. At the time, Pastrana became the only professional boxer from Madrid.

In October 2016, Pastrana competed for the vacant WBC silver female minimumweight title against Tina Rupprecht, but lost by unanimous decision after ten rounds. This was also the first loss in her professional career.

In May 2017, Pastrana won the EBU European female minimumweight title, after defeating French Sandy Coget by unanimous decision, in a bout held at the Palacio Vistalegre in Madrid. A few months later, in September, Pastrana made the first defense of her European title against Judit Hachbold, defeating the Hungarian fighter by knockout in the third round.

On 22 June 2018, Pastrana won the IBF world female minimumweight title, her first world title, against German Asiye Özlem Sahin. Pastrana became the second Spanish female boxer to win a world title after María Jesús Rosa Reina, who won an IBF world championship in 2004.

Pastrana made two successful defenses of her world title. One against Siriporn Thaweesuk won by technical knockout and another one against Ana Arrazola won by unanimous decision.

On 4 August 2019, Pastrana fought Yokasta Valle from Costa Rica for the mini flyweight world title, in a bout held at Marbella. Pastrana lost the fight by split decision after ten rounds.

Professional boxing record

External links

References

1990 births
Living people
Mini-flyweight boxers
Spanish women boxers
International Boxing Federation champions
Sportspeople from Madrid
21st-century Spanish women